José Luis Pavoni (born 23 May 1954) is an Argentine football coach and former player. He won honours with all four of his club teams and represented the Argentina national football team at the 1975 Copa América.

Playing career 

Pavoni started his professional career in 1973 at Newell's Old Boys in Rosario. In 1974, he was part of the squad that won the Metropolitano, bringing Newell's their first major championship title.

In 1975 Pavoni was part of the Argentina squad for the 1975 Copa América, which saw Argentina exit in the first round despite an 11-0 win against Venezuela.

In 1978 Pavoni joined River Plate where he won a further four league titles. In 1982, he joined Mexican side UNAM Pumas where he was part of the squad that won the 1982 CONCACAF Champions' Cup.

In 1983, he returned to Argentina to join Argentinos Juniors. During his time at the club, Argentinos enjoyed their golden age, winning back to back league championships in the Metropolitano 1984 and the Nacional 1985. They went on to win the Copa Libertadores 1985, also claiming the 1985 Copa Interamericana and playing in the Copa Intercontinental against Juventus of Italy.

Coaching career 

Since his retirement as a player, Pavoni has held a number of coaching positions. He was field assistant to Ramón Díaz at River Plate as they won the Copa Libertadores in 1996, he has been involved with the youth teams at Argentinos Juniors and at Newell's Old Boys.

Pavoni has also worked with the Peru Under-17 and Under-20 teams. He was in charge of the Peru under-20 team at the 2007 South American Youth Championship.

Honours

Player 
 Newell's Old Boys
Primera División Argentina: Metropolitano 1974

 River Plate
Primera División Argentina: Metropolitano 1979, Nacional 1979, Metropolitano 1980, Nacional 1981

 UNAM Pumas
CONCACAF Champions' Cup: 1982

 Argentinos Juniors
Primera División Argentina: Metropolitano 1984, Nacional 1985
Copa Libertadores: 1985
Copa Interamericana: 1985

References

External links 

1954 births
Living people
Footballers from Rosario, Santa Fe
Argentine footballers
Argentina international footballers
1975 Copa América players
Association football defenders
Newell's Old Boys footballers
Club Atlético River Plate footballers
Tecos F.C. footballers
Argentinos Juniors footballers
Argentine football managers
Argentine Primera División players
Argentine expatriate footballers
Expatriate footballers in Mexico